Connie Berube Binsfeld (April 18, 1924 – January 12, 2014) was an American Republican politician from the U.S. State of Michigan. She served as the 60th lieutenant governor of Michigan. Starting as an advocate for the environment in planning for the Sleeping Bear Dunes National Lakeshore, she also was known for protecting interests of women and children. She was the first woman to hold leadership posts in Michigan's House, Senate and executive branch, where she served four terms in the House, two in the Senate, and two as Lieutenant Governor.

Biography
Born Connie Berube in Munising, Michigan, in 1924, she attended local schools. After graduating from high school, Berube went to Siena Heights College. After she married in the 1940s, she and her husband settled near Detroit and had a family. She later taught high school history and politics.

Binsfeld became involved in local politics in Leelanau County, Michigan, where she and her family moved to Glen Lake from Detroit in 1968. She headed a citizens' council to participate in planning for the Sleeping Bear Dunes National Seashore. She served 10 years on the Great Lakes Commission.

Recognized for her speaking and leadership, Binsfeld was first elected to political office as county commissioner for Leelanau County, Michigan. In 1974, she was elected to the first of four successive terms in the Michigan House of Representatives. She would later serve two terms in the Michigan Senate. As a member of the Legislature, she was known for sponsoring some of the strongest legislation to address domestic violence, and was known as an advocate for women and children. She continued her interest in the environment. At the time of her death, Gov. Rick Snyder noted the importance of her sponsoring the Sand Dunes Protection Act and introducing the 1983 Quality of Life Bonding Bill for cleanup of areas.

In 1990, Binsfeld was selected to be the running mate of Republican gubernatorial candidate John Engler. She took office as the state's lieutenant governor in 1991 and served until early 1999. As lieutenant governor, she headed the Binsfeld Children's Commission. Its investigation of issues related to adoption and the child welfare system produced 197 proposed reforms, including for adoption and other laws. The state legislature passed 20 laws drafted by Binsfeld and her staff to make policy to implement these recommendations.

Binsfeld died at age 89 in Glen Lake, Michigan, on January 12, 2014, in hospice.

Personal life
She was married to John Binsfeld. They had five children together: John, Greg, Susan, Paul and Mike.

Legacy and honors
1977, named Michigan Mother of the Year
1990, Binsfeld received the Sister Ann Joachim Award from her alma mater, Siena Heights University. 
In 1998, she was named to the Michigan Women's Hall of Fame.
She also received Honorary Doctorates of Humane Letters from University of Notre Dame, Northern Michigan University, Grand Valley State University, and other institutions of higher learning.

See also
List of female lieutenant governors in the United States

References

External links
Lt. Gov. Connie Binsfeld, State of Michigan profile]
 "Connie Binsfeld", Notable Women of NW Michigan
"Lt. Gov. Connie Binsfeld Obituary", Reynolds-Jonkhoff Funeral Home, January 2014

	

1924 births
2014 deaths
People from Munising, Michigan
People from Leelanau County, Michigan
Siena Heights University alumni
County commissioners in Michigan
Republican Party members of the Michigan House of Representatives
Republican Party Michigan state senators
Lieutenant Governors of Michigan
Women state constitutional officers of Michigan
Women state legislators in Michigan
20th-century American politicians
20th-century American women politicians
21st-century American women